Jermaine Anderson (born February 8, 1983) is a Canadian retired professional basketball player. He is a veteran member of the Canadian national basketball team.

High school and college
Anderson attended Eastern Commerce Collegiate Institute in Toronto, playing with the school's basketball team until graduating in the class of 2001.

Anderson attended Fordham University from the 2002–03 season through to 2005–06, where, as a senior, he started all 32 games for the Rams averaging 15.6 points, 3.7 rebounds and 3.4 assists per game.

Professional career 
On August 2, 2013, he signed a one-year deal with TBB Trier. On August 11, 2014, he re-signed with Trier for one more season.

On August 28, 2015, he signed with Baloncesto Sevilla of the Spanish Liga ACB. On January 19, 2016, he parted ways with Sevilla after appearing in 15 games. On February 2, 2016, he returned to his former team Basketball Löwen Braunschweig for the rest of the season.

On August 18, 2016, Anderson signed with the French team Châlons-Reims. On January 19, 2017, he left Châlons-Reims and signed with Montenegrin club Mornar Bar. He left Mornar after appearing in six games. In April 2017, he returned to Châlons-Reims for the rest of the season.

National team career 
Anderson has been a member of Canada's senior men's basketball team since 2004, and has played in over 75 international games with the team.

Anderson participated in the 2009 FIBA Americas Championship, he helped lead Canada to a 4th-place finish losing in the 3rd place game to Argentina. The 88–73 loss to Argentina was also Anderson's best game of the tournament scoring 19 points, 11 assists and 4 rebounds. Anderson was voted to the all-tournament third team along with teammate Joel Anthony.

References

External links 
Eurobasket.com profile
FIBA game-center profile
FIBA.com profile

1983 births
Living people
ABA League players
Basketball Löwen Braunschweig players
Basketball players at the 2007 Pan American Games
Basketball players from Toronto
BC Zenit Saint Petersburg players
Black Canadian basketball players
Brose Bamberg players
Canadian expatriate basketball people in Croatia
Canadian expatriate basketball people in France
Canadian expatriate basketball people in Germany
Canadian expatriate basketball people in Greece
Canadian expatriate basketball people in Montenegro
Canadian expatriate basketball people in Poland
Canadian expatriate basketball people in Russia
Canadian expatriate basketball people in Spain
Canadian expatriate basketball people in the United States 
Fordham Rams men's basketball players
KK Budućnost players
KK Cedevita players
KK Cibona players
KK Mornar Bar players
Liga ACB players
Pan American Games competitors for Canada
Panionios B.C. players
Point guards
Real Betis Baloncesto players
Reims Champagne Basket players
Tigers Tübingen players
2010 FIBA World Championship players